The 2020–21 Qatari League, also known as Qatar Stars League or QNB Stars League for sponsorship reasons, was the 47th edition of top-level football championship in Qatar. Al-Duhail are the defending champions.

Al Sadd won the league title for a record 15th time, without suffering a defeat during the entire campaign.

Teams

Stadia and locations

Personnel and kits

Managerial changes

Foreign players
 Players name in bold indicates the player is registered during the mid-season transfer window.

 Players in italics were out of squad or left club within the season, after pre-season transfer window, or in the mid-season transfer window, and at least had one appearance.

League table

Results

Positions by round

Relegation play-off

Season statistics

Top scorers

Top assists

Clean sheets

References

External links
 

Qatar Stars League seasons
1
Qatar